Kışlaköy is a village in Mut district of Mersin Province, Turkey. Göksu River is to the west of the village. Population of Kışlaköy was 207 as of  2012.

References

Villages in Mut District